Highway 952 is a provincial highway in the Canadian province of Saskatchewan. It runs from Highway 263 to Highway 953.

Highway 952 provides access to the subdivisions of Carwin Park, Guise Beach, McIntosh Point, and Okema Beach. The Emma Lake (Murray Point) Recreation Site section of Great Blue Heron Provincial Park on Emma Lake is also accessible from Highway 952. The portion of Highway 952 which is west of Okema Beach is not maintained.

See also 
Roads in Saskatchewan
Transportation in Saskatchewan

References 

952